Evripidis Katsavos (born 14 September 1973) is a retired Greek football midfielder.

References

1973 births
Living people
Greek footballers
Veria F.C. players
AEK Athens F.C. players
OFI Crete F.C. players
Apollon Pontou FC players
Levadiakos F.C. players
Athlitiki Enosi Larissa F.C. players
Anagennisi Arta F.C. players
Anagennisi Epanomi F.C. players
Super League Greece players
Association football midfielders
Footballers from Veria